Barış Yardımcı (born 14 August 1992) is a Turkish footballer who plays as a right back for Konyaspor.

International career
He has played at various youth levels for the Turkish Football Association. He made his senior debut for the senior Turkey national football team in a friendly 2-0 loss to Romania on 9 November 2017.

References

External links
 

1992 births
Living people
Association football defenders
Association football forwards
Bursaspor footballers
Gaziantepspor footballers
Hatayspor footballers
Süper Lig players
Turkey international footballers
Turkey youth international footballers
Turkish footballers